Greta Schröder (27 June 1892 – 8 June 1980) was a German actress. She is best known for the role of Thomas Hutter's wife and Count Orlok's victim in Nosferatu (1922). In the fictionalized 2000 film Shadow of the Vampire, she is portrayed as having been a famous actress during the making of Nosferatu, but in fact she was little known. The bulk of her career was during the 1920s, and she continued to act well into the 1950s, but by the 1930s her roles had diminished to only occasional appearances. Following a failed marriage with struggling actor Ernst Matray, she was married to actor and film director Paul Wegener.

According to the Austrian writer Kay Weniger, Greta Schröder died in 1980, though some sources mention 1967.

Filmography

Actress
1913: Die Insel der Seligen
1920: The Red Peacock as Alfred's sister
1920: The Golem: How He Came into the World as a lady of the court
1920: The Closed Chain 
1921: The Lost Shadow as Countess Dorothea Durande
1921: Circus of Life  as Alegria
1921: Marizza as Sadja
1921: Nosferatu as Ellen Hutter
1922: Es leuchtet meine Liebe
1923: Brüder
1923: Paganini  as Antonia Paganini
1930: Die zwölfte Stunde - Eine Nacht des Grauens (re-edited version of Nosferatu with sound)
1937: Victoria the Great as Baroness Lehzen
1938: Sixty Glorious Years as Baroness Lehzen
1943: Melody of a Great City 
1943: Wild Bird as Jutta Lossen
1945: Kolberg as Sophie Marie von Voß
1951: Maria Theresa
1953: Stars Over Colombo 
1953: Anna Louise and Anton

Writer
1915: Zucker und Zimt
1916: Das Phantom der Oper

References in popular culture 
 In the 2000 film Shadow of the Vampire, which depicted the production of Nosferatu, Catherine McCormack portrayed Greta Schröder.

References

External links
 

Text of a letter by Greta Schröder from 1911

1892 births
1980 deaths
German stage actresses
German film actresses
German silent film actresses
20th-century German actresses